Blepharispermum is a genus of flowering plants in the aster family, Asteraceae. They are distributed in Africa, Madagascar, the Arabian Peninsula, India, and Sri Lanka.

These are shrubs and small trees. The leaf blades are sometimes borne on petioles, which may have spines. The flower head contains 2 female disc florets and 2 to 4 male disc florets. The latter are whitish, greenish, or yellowish. The fruit is a rough-edged cypsela with a pappus.

 Species

References

Athroismeae
Asteraceae genera
Taxonomy articles created by Polbot